{{Infobox person
| name               = Kim Hyun-mok
| image              = 20210908—Kim Hyun-mok 김현목, photo shoot, Marie Claire Korea (05m31s).jpg
| caption            = Kim in 2021
| birth_name         = Kim Hyun-mok
| birth_date         = 
| birth_place        = South Korea
| other_names        = Kim Hyeon-mok
| education          = Korea University (BA in Environmental Ecology Engineering and Sociology)
| occupation         = Actor, Model
| agent              = ASP Company
| years_active       = 2016–present
| known_for          = Extraordinary You  Once Again  Into the Ring
}}

Kim Hyun-mok is a South Korean actor and model. He is known for his roles in dramas such as Extraordinary You, Once Again, and Into the Ring''.

Filmography

Television series

Film

Awards and nominations

References

External links
 
 

1991 births
Living people
21st-century South Korean male actors
South Korean male models
South Korean male film actors
South Korean male television actors